These are the Canadian number-one albums of 2010. The chart is compiled by Nielsen Soundscan and published by Jam! Canoe, issued every Sunday. The chart also appears in Billboard magazine as Top Canadian Albums.

External links
Top 100 albums in Canada on Jam
Billboard Top Canadian Albums

See also
List of Hot 100 number-one singles of 2010 (Canada)
List of number-one music downloads of 2010 (Canada)

References

2010
Canada
2010 in Canadian music